Nigel McGown Green (15 October 192415 May 1972) was an English character actor. Because of his strapping build, commanding height and regimental demeanour he would often be found playing military types and men of action in such classic 1960s films as Jason and the Argonauts, Zulu, Tobruk and The Ipcress File.

Early life and stage career
The son of a professor, Green was born in Pretoria, South Africa, and was raised in London, attending King's College School, Wimbledon and the University of London, followed by the Royal Academy of Dramatic Art. During the Second World War he trained as an Observer in the Royal Navy's Fleet Air Arm.

Among early stage appearances, he was at London's New Theatre (now the Noël Coward Theatre) in October 1948, playing multiple roles in John Burrell's Old Vic company revival of The Tragical History of Doctor Faustus. At the Stratford Memorial Theatre in 1950, he was cast as Sir Thomas Lovell in Henry VIII (directed by Tyrone Guthrie), Abhorson in Peter Brook's production of Measure for Measure (which also went on tour in Germany), Decius Brutus in Julius Caesar (directed by Anthony Quayle), and - most notably - Edmund in King Lear, starring and co-directed by John Gielgud.

Subsequent West End appearances included Come Live With Me (directed by Roy Rich: Vaudeville Theatre, June 1951), Heloise (directed by Michael Powell: Duke of York's Theatre, November 1951), Vernon Sylvaine's As Long as They're Happy, opposite Jack Buchanan (directed by Roy Rich: Garrick Theatre, July 1953), Félicien Marceau's The Egg (directed by Charles Frank: Saville Theatre, October 1957)) and Agatha Christie's Go Back for Murder (directed by Hubert Gregg: Duchess Theatre, March 1960).

In his second volume of autobiography, Michael Powell pointed out that, though the play they collaborated on was a failure, "Nigel Green, with his great face and towering figure, would soon make a name for himself in movies. Who could ever forget him in Zulu? He was an almost mythical figure, like Harry Andrews and Victor McLaglen, and later John Wayne, all of them genuine and generous artists. Among other men they were like Norse gods, mythical, large and gentle, suddenly exploding into rage and performing fabulous feats of strength."

Screen career
Early film roles included Reach for the Sky (1956), The Criminal (1960), The League of Gentlemen (1960) and Beat Girl (1960). His large physique led to his being cast as Little John in the film Sword of Sherwood Forest (1960).

He had one of his most memorable roles as Hercules in Jason and the Argonauts (1963), followed by his co-starring role as Colour Sergeant Frank Bourne in Zulu (1964). He had a leading role as Inspector Sir Denis Nayland Smith in The Face of Fu Manchu (1965) and the supporting role of Major Dalby in The Ipcress File (also 1965). Other roles include Carl Petersen in the Bulldog Drummond film Deadlier Than the Male (1967),  as McCune, a devious Australian in the 1967 comedy-adventure The Pink Jungle, Count Contini in the Matt Helm film The Wrecking Crew (1969), and 'Lord Ashley's Whore' in John Huston's The Kremlin Letter (1969). His many military roles included parts in Khartoum (1966), Tobruk (1967), Fräulein Doktor and Play Dirty (both 1969).

Green also appeared in a number of horror films, including Corridors of Blood (1958), The Masque of the Red Death (1964), The Skull (1965), Let's Kill Uncle (1966) and Countess Dracula (1971). His penultimate role was as McKyle the 'Electric Messiah', a mental patient believing himself to be God, in The Ruling Class (1972).

His television appearances included The Adventures of Sir Lancelot, The Adventures of William Tell, The Other Man, Danger Man, The Power Game, The Avengers, Sherlock Holmes, Jason King, The Protectors and The Persuaders!.

Personal life
Green's first wife was the actress Patricia Marmont. His second wife was the actress Pamela Gordon, with whom he had one daughter.

Death
Green died following an overdose of sleeping pills in 1972, aged 47. It is unknown if his death was intentional. Peter O'Toole said on his commentary on The Ruling Class that he believed Green was very depressed and that his death shortly after filming ended was a suicide, although Green's family believed it to be accidental. He was separated from Gordon at the time.

Filmography

Film

Television

See also
List of unsolved deaths

References

Sources
 
 
 Terence Pettigrew (1982). British Character Actors (Rowman & Littlefield).

External links

1924 births
1972 deaths
1972 suicides
20th-century English male actors
Alumni of King's College London
Alumni of RADA
Barbiturates-related deaths
English male film actors
English male stage actors
English male television actors
English people of South African descent
Fleet Air Arm personnel of World War II
People educated at King's College School, London
People from Pretoria
South African emigrants to the United Kingdom
Unsolved deaths in England